Sarce Aronggear (born July 7, 1979) is an Indonesian sprint canoer who competed in the mid-2000s. At the 2004 Summer Olympics in Athens, she was eliminated in the heats of the K-1 500 m event.

External links
Sports-Reference.com profile

1979 births
Canoeists at the 2004 Summer Olympics
Indonesian female canoeists
Sportspeople from Papua
Living people
Olympic canoeists of Indonesia
Asian Games medalists in dragon boat
Dragon boat racers at the 2010 Asian Games
Canoeists at the 2002 Asian Games
Canoeists at the 2006 Asian Games
Canoeists at the 2010 Asian Games
Medalists at the 2010 Asian Games
Asian Games silver medalists for Indonesia
Dragon boat racers
21st-century Indonesian women